The list includes all individuals who were first in line to the throne of Greece, either as heir apparent or as heir presumptive, since 1832 (cf. Crown Prince of Greece). Those who actually succeeded to the throne are shown in bold.

Heir to the throne (House of Wittelsbach)

Heir to the throne (House of Glücksburg)

See also
 Duke of Sparta

References

Greek monarchy
Greece
Greece
Lists of princes